Stenoloba is an East Asian genus of moths of the family Noctuidae. The genus was described by Staudinger in 1892.

Taxonomy
It was included in the subfamily Acontiinae by early authors until Shigero Sugi revised the Japanese species of the genus and established its position in the Bryophilinae in 1970.

Diversity
The genus presently includes about 100 species that are arranged in 23 species groups.

Species
jankowskii species group
Stenoloba jankowskii (Oberthür, 1884) Primorye, Korea, Japan, north-eastern China
Stenoloba marina Draudt, 1950 China (Zhejiang, Hunan, Sichuan)
Stenoloba marinela Han, Kononenko & Behounek, 2011 Yunnan
Stenoloba assimilis (Warren, 1909) Korea, Japan
Stenoloba assimilina Han & Kononenko, 2018 south-western China (Xizang)
Stenoloba lampra Kononenko & Ronkay, 2000 northern Vietnam
ochraceola species group
Stenoloba ochraceola Han & Kononenko, 2018 Yunnan
manleyi species group
Stenoloba manleyi (Leech, 1889) Japan
Stenoloba yunley Han & Kononenko, 2009 Yunnan
Stenoloba viridibasis Han & Kononenko, 2009 Yunnan
Stenoloba pontezi Saldaitis & Volynkin, 2020 Yunnan
Stenoloba likianga Kononenko & Ronkay, 2000 Yunnan
Stenoloba bachmana Kononenko & Ronkay, 2000 northern Vietnam
Stenoloba pulla Ronkay, 2001 Taiwan, Yunnan, northern Vietnam
Stenoloba liuii Chen, 1999 Hainan
Stenoloba ronkayi Behounek & Kononenko, 2010 northern Vietnam
Stenoloba gaoligonga Han & Kononenko, 2018 Yunnan
huanxipoa species group
Stenoloba huanxipoa Han & Kononenko, 2018 Yunnan
Stenoloba chlorobrunnea Han & Kononenko, 2018 south-western China (Xizang)
clara species group
Stenoloba clara (Leech, 1889) Japan, Korea, central China
Stenoloba clarescens Kononenko & Ronkay, 2000 Taiwan
oculata species group
Stenoloba albiangulata (Mell, 1943) China (Guangdong, Jiangxi), northern Vietnam
Stenoloba oculata Draudt, 1950 eastern China, central China, ..., Japan, Korea
Stenoloba oculatoides Han & Kononenko, 2018 Yunnan
Stenoloba brunnescens Kononenko & Ronkay, 2000 northern Vietnam, Yunnan
Stenoloba plumbeoviridis Han & Kononenko, 2018 Yunnan
Stenoloba plumbeobrunnea Han & Kononenko, 2018 Yunnan
Stenoloba cucullata Han & Kononenko, 2018 Yunnan
Stenoloba yenminia Ronkay, 2001 Taiwan
Stenoloba qingchenga Pekarsky, 2018 China (Guangdong, Sichuan), northern Vietnam
Stenoloba leonie Pekarsky, 2018 Vietnam
viridinivea species group
Stenoloba viridinivea Han & Kononenko, 2009 Yunnan
brunneola species group
Stenoloba brunneola (Draudt, 1950) Yunnan
Stenoloba pinratanai Behounek & Kononenko, 2010
olivacea species group
Stenoloba olivacea (Wileman, 1914) Taiwan
Stenoloba benedeki Ronkay, 2001 northern Vietnam
Stenoloba fontinalis Kononenko & Ronkay, 1998 Korea
Stenoloba albistriata Kononenko & Ronkay, 2000 northern Myanmar, Yunnan
Stenoloba cineracea Kononenko & Ronkay, 2000 Shaanxi
Stenoloba solaris Pekarsky & Saldaitis, 2013 northern Yunnan
Stenoloba subsolaris Pekarsky, Dvorák & Ronkay, 2013 Sichuan
Stenoloba sapa Perkarsky & Behounek, 2019 northern Vietnam
rectilinea species group
Stenoloba rectilinea Yoshimoto, 1992 Yunnan, Nepal
Stenoloba rectilinoides Han & Kononenko, 2018 Yunnan
futii species group
Stenoloba futii Kononenko & Ronkay, 2000 Peninsular Malaysia
Stenoloba elegans Prout, 1928 Borneo
Stenoloba robusta Prout, 1928 Borneo
Stenoloba pendleburyi Holloway, 2009 Peninsular Malaysia, Borneo
Stenoloba ansari Behounek & Kononenko, 2010 Java
Stenoloba wolfgangi Behounek & Kononenko, 2010 Sumatra
Stenoloba albibasis Behounek & Kononenko, 2010 Sumatra
Stenoloba javensis Behounek & Kononenko, 2010 Java
Stenoloba futioides Behounek & Kononenko, 2010 Sumatra
Stenoloba viridibrunnea Behounek & Kononenko, 2010 Sumatra
Stenoloba benjamini Behounek & Kononenko, 2010 Sumatra
Stenoloba dentilinea Behounek & Kononenko, 2010 Sumatra
basiviridis species group
Stenoloba basiviridis Draudt, 1950 China (Zhejiang, Fujian, Shaanxi)
Stenoloba domina Kononenko & Ronkay, 2000 Taiwan
Stenoloba dominula Kononenko & Ronkay, 2000 Fujian
Stenoloba siamensis Behounek & Kononenko, 2010 northern Thailand
Stenoloba mossy Behounek & Kononenko, 2010 northern Vietnam
sericea species group
Stenoloba sericea Kononenko & Ronkay, 2001 northern Vietnam
Stenoloba variegata Kononenko & Ronkay, 2001 northern Vietnam
Stenoloba viridimicta Hampson, 1910 Khasis
Stenoloba chlorographa Kononenko & Ronkay, 2001 Nepal
Stenoloba sacculata Behounek & Kononenko, 2010 northern Vietnam
lichenosa species group
Stenoloba lichenosa Kononenko & Ronkay, 2001 Taiwan
Stenoloba lichenosella Kononenko & Ronkay, 2001 northern Vietnam
Stenoloba aenescens (Moore, 1888) Nepal, Sikkim
glaucescens species group
Stenoloba glaucescens (Hampson, 1894) Nepal, Khasis, south-western China (Yunnan, Zizang)
Stenoloba glauca Kononenko & Ronkay, 2001 northern Vietnam, South Korea, Taiwan
Stenoloba albipicta Kononenko & Ronkay, 2001 Yunnan
rufosagitta species group
Stenoloba rufosagitta Kononenko & Ronkay, 2001 Taiwan, northern Vietnam, China (Chekiang, Hunan)
Stenoloba rufosagittoides Han & Kononenko, 2009 Sichuan
Stenoloba viridicollar Pekarsky, 2011 China (Sichuan, Fujian)
Stenoloba plumbeoculata Pekarsky, Dvorák & Ronkay, 2013 China (Fujian, Guangdon, Yunnan, Sichuan)
nigrabasalis species group
Stenoloba nigrabasalis Chang, 1991 Taiwan
Stenoloba ochribasis Kononenko & Ronkay, 2001 Laos
Stenoloba herbacea Saldaitis & Volynkin, 2020 Yunnan
Stenoloba nora Kononenko & Ronkay, 2001 Taiwan, China (Yunnan, Fujian), northern Vietnam
Stenoloba uncata Han & Kononenko, 2018 Yunnan
viridescens species group
Stenoloba viridescens Kononenko & Ronkay, 2001 northern Vietnam
Stenoloba cinechlora Kononenko & Ronkay, 2001 northern Vietnam
Stenoloba speideli (Kononenko & Ronkay, 2001) northern Vietnam, China (Fujian, Yunnan, Guandong)
Stenoloba tonkina Kononenko & Ronkay, 2001 northern Vietnam
Stenoloba longipennis Kononenko & Ronkay, 2001 northern Vietnam
Stenoloba acutivalva Han & Kononenko, 2009 China (Yunnan, Guangxi)
Stenoloba motuoensis Han & Lü, 2007 China (Fujian, Yunnan, Xizang), Tibet
Stenoloba micochracea Pekarsky, Dvorák & Ronkay, 2013 Laos
lanceola species group
Stenoloba lanceola Ronkay, 2001 northern Vietnam
matovi species group
Stenoloba matovi Behounek & Kononenko, 2010
asymmetrica species group
Stenoloba asymmetrica Han & Kononenko, 2018 Yunnan
acontioides species group
Stenoloba acontioides Han & Kononenko, 2018 Yunnan
Unrecognized species group
Stenoloba ferrimacula (Hampson, 1907) Khasis
Stenoloba prasinana Warren, 1913 Khasia Hills
Stenoloba punctistigma (Hampson, 1894) Simla
Stenoloba simplicilinea Warren, 1913 Khasia Hills
Stenoloba umbrifera Hampson, 1918 Sichuan
Stenoloba hystrix Sohn & Tzuoo, 2012 northern Vietnam

References

 Pekarsky, O. & Saldaitis, A. (2013). "A new species of Stenoloba Staudinger, 1892 from China (Lepidoptera, Noctuidae, Bryophilinae)". Zookeys. 310: 1–6.
 Pekarsky, O.; Dvořák, M. & Ronkay, G. (2013). "Three new species of Stenoloba Staudinger, 1892 from Southeast Asia (Lepidoptera, Noctuidae, Bryophilinae)". Fibigeriana Supplement. 1: 165–170. color plates: 289–290.

Bryophilinae